Ek Tara is a 2015 Musical, Drama Marathi language film directed by Avadhoot Gupte. The film  released on 30 Jan 2015. It stars Santosh Juvekar and Tejaswini Pandit in lead. It is Santosh Juvekar's third film with Avadhoot Gupte after Zenda and Morya.

Cast
 Santosh Juvekar as Dyaneshwar Lokhande (Mauli)
 Tejaswini Pandit as Urja
 Urmila Nibalkar as Chatura
 Sagar Karande as Vithu
 Amol Gupte as Chhota Shaukat
 Mangesh Desai as Sadaba
 Abhedya Gupte as Omkar Lokhande (Child Artist)
 Raiees Lashkaria as Urja’s Boss
 Sunil Tawade as Amar Thite (Sarpanch)
 Chaitanya Chandratre as Amogh
 Santosh Mayekar as Padmbhushan Gattamvar
 Maadhav Deochake

Soundtrack

The lyrics for the film are penned by  Guru Thakur, Avadhoot Gupte with music composed by Avadhoot Gupte.

Track listing

Reception
The film has received positive reviews.Times Of India's Mihir Bhanage gave film 3 stars saying, " the film is good to watch and can be put on your weekend watch list.".

References

External links

2015 films
2010s Marathi-language films